Ervin Šinko (born Franjo Spitzer; 5 October 1898 – 26 March 1967) was a Hungarian-Yugoslavian writer, publisher and poet.

Šinko was born in Apatin to a Jewish family on 5 October 1898. He attended elementary school in Apatin and gymnasium in Subotica. During World War I, in 1917, Šinko was mobilized and in 1918 he participated in the establishment of the Hungarian Soviet Republic. At the center of his literary occupation were the topics and questions about the Hungarian Revolution. Šinko worked in many Hungarian magazine such as: "A Tett", "Ma", "Internationale", "Tüz", "Korunk", "Nyugat" and others. He moved to Vienna, where in 1924 he published magazine "Testvér". Šinko also lived in Zurich, Moscow and Paris. While in Paris his articles were published in "L'Europe", "Monde" and "Ce Soir". In 1939 he moved to Croatia, Zagreb, where he lived until World War II. During World War II he escaped to Dalmatia, where he was arrested and imprisoned by Italian Fascist. After the capitulation of Italy and liberation, Šinko joined the Partisans. In 1945 he moved back to Zagreb, where stayed for the rest of his life. Šinko was member of the Yugoslav Academy of Sciences and Arts from 1950 and as a regular member since 1960. He also was a member of the Croatian Writers Society. In 1946 he began to devote his energies to literary studies and writings on public affairs. In 1959 he became professor and director of the Hungarian department at Novi Sad University.

Šinko died on 26 March 1967 in Zagreb and was buried at the Mirogoj Cemetery.

Works

Book of poems 
 Éjszakák és hajnalok, 1916
 Fáajdalmas istem, Fischer, Beč, 1923

Novel 
 Četrnaest dana, Nakladni zavod Hrvatske, Zagreb, 1947
 Optimisti: roman jedne revolucije, Zora, Zagreb, 1954  
 Optimisták: történelmi regény 1918/19-ből, Magvető, Budimpešta, 1965 
 Optimisták, Noran Libro Kiadó, Budimpešta, 2010

Novella 
 Aegidius útra kelése, 1927
 Aronova ljubav, Zora, Zagreb, 1951

Stories 
 Pripovijetke, Zora, Zagreb, 1950

Literary Studies and essays 
 Eto ide naša sila...: uz omladinsku prugu, Nakladni zavod Hrvatske, Zagreb, 1947
 Književne studije, Nakladni zavod Hrvatske, Zagreb, 1949
 Sablast kruži Evropom: članci, rasprave i predavanja (1948.-1951.), Zora, Zagreb, 1951
 Roman jednog romana: bilješke iz moskovskog dnevnika od 1935 do 1937 godine., Zora, Zagreb, 1955
 Falanga Antikrista i drugi komentari, Zora, Zagreb, 1957
 Lik književnika danas, Univerzum, Zagreb, 1957
 Roman eines Romans: Moskauer Tagebuch, Verlag Wissenschaft und Politik, Köln, 1962
 Csokonai életmüve, Forum, Novi Sad, 1965
 Pjesme u prozi, Pripovijetke, Zapisi, Ogledi, Matica hrvatska, Zora, Zagreb, 1969 
 Sablast kruži Evropom, Globus, Zagreb, 1982 
 Drvarski dnevnik, BIGZ, Beograd, 1987 
 Krleža: esszék, tanulmányok, kommentárok, Forum Könyvkiadó, Novi Sad, 1987
 Az út. Naplók: 1916–1939, Akadémiai Kiadó, Budimpešta, 1990 
 Roman eines Romans: Moskauer Tagebuch, 1935–1937, Das Arsenal, Berlin, 1990

Bibliography

References 

1898 births
1967 deaths
People from Apatin
Burials at Mirogoj Cemetery
Croatian Jews
Jewish Hungarian writers
Austro-Hungarian Jews
Croatian Austro-Hungarians
Croatian people of Hungarian-Jewish descent
Croatian people of Serbian-Jewish descent
Croatian male poets
20th-century Hungarian poets
20th-century Croatian poets
20th-century Hungarian male writers